Tommy Nutter (17 April 1943 – 17 August 1992) was a British tailor, famous for reinventing the Savile Row suit in the 1960s.

Born in Barmouth, Meirionnydd to Christopher Nutter and Dorothy (formerly Banister), he was raised in Edgware, Middlesex, where his father owned a cafe. After the family moved to Kilburn, Nutter and his brother David attended Willesden Technical College. Nutter initially studied plumbing, and then architecture, but he abandoned both aged 19 to study tailoring at the Tailor and Cutter Academy.

In the early 1960s, he joined traditional tailors Donaldson, Williamson & Ward. After seven years, in 1969, he joined up with Edward Sexton, to open Nutters of Savile Row at No 35a Savile Row. They were financially backed by Cilla Black and her husband Bobby Willis, Managing Director of the Beatles' Apple Corps Peter Brown, and lawyer James Vallance-White.

The business was an immediate success, as Nutter combined traditional tailoring skills with innovative design. He designed for the Hardy Amies range, and then for the man himself. His clients included his investors, plus Sir Roy Strong, Mick Jagger, Bianca Jagger and Elton John. Nutter was most proud that, for the cover of The Beatles' album Abbey Road in 1969, he dressed three out of the four: George Harrison elected to be photographed on the road-crossing in denims.

In the 1970s his bespoke business became less successful, but he branched out into ready to wear clothing, marketed through Austin Reed. He also successfully expanded into East Asia, establishing the Savile Row brand in Japan. In 1976  Sexton bought Nutter out of the Business.  Nutter went to work for Kilgour French and Stanbury, managing his own workroom. Sexton continued to run Nutters of Savile Row until 1983, when Nutter returned to the row with a ready to wear shop: "Tommy Nutter, Savile Row". This new venture, which traded at No 19 Savile Row until Nutter's death, was backed by J&J Crombie Limited, who continue to own the "Tommy Nutter" trademark. At this time, Sexton set up a business in his own name.

In the 1980s, he described his suits as a "cross between the big-shouldered Miami Vice look and the authentic Savile Row." He created the clothing of The Joker worn by Jack Nicholson in the 1989 film Batman.

Nutter died in 1992 at the Cromwell Hospital in London of complications from AIDS. In 2018, House of Nutter: The Rebel Tailor of Savile Row, a biography of Nutter, with reminiscences by his brother David, a New York celebrity photographer, was published; it was written by Lance Richardson.

References

External links

Victoria & Albert Museum: Blue check wool suit, Designed by Tommy Nutter, London, 1966
Obituary in New York Times
Nutters of Savile Row Website

LGBT fashion designers
Menswear designers
British tailors
English fashion designers
Businesspeople from London
1943 births
1992 deaths
AIDS-related deaths in England
English LGBT artists
People from Edgware
People from Gwynedd
Savile Row Bespoke Association members
1960s fashion
1970s fashion
1960s in London
1970s in London
20th-century English male artists
20th-century English businesspeople
20th-century LGBT people